Guryong can refer to the several places in South Korea:
 Guryong Station
 Guryong Falls
 Guryong Valley
 Guryong Village